C4ISRNET (previously C4ISR, or C4ISR: The Journal of Net-Centric Warfare) is a publication covering emerging issues and trends in global military transformation and network centric warfare technologies, products and services for federal government managers, defense, and industry. It is published nine times per year.

C4ISRNET was established in 2002. The magazine is published by Sightline Media Group, which was a part of Gannett Company (NYSE:GCI). 
As part of the spinoff of digital and broadcasting properties in 2015, Gannett spun off these properties to Tegna.  In March 2016, Tegna sold Sightline Media Group to Regent, a Los Angeles-based private equity firm controlled by investor Michael Reinstein.
C4ISRNET'''s headquarters is in Tysons, Virginia.

The 16th annual C4ISRNET'' Conference was on May 3, 2017, at the Renaissance Arlington Capital View.

References

External links
 

Business magazines published in the United States
Monthly magazines published in the United States
Gannett publications
Magazines established in 2002
Magazines published in Virginia
Military magazines published in the United States
Military technology
Professional and trade magazines